The Forêt de Marly (known as the forêt de Cruye until the 18th century) is a 2000 hectare forest estate in Yvelines, between Saint-Germain-en-Laye and Versailles  about 15 km to the west of Paris.  It is about 12 km long east to west, over the communes of Louveciennes, Marly-le-Roi, Saint-Nom-la-Bretèche, Feucherolles and others.  Historically, it was a hunting estate of the kings of France, then of the presidents of the Republic, but (since 1935) is now divided along its whole length by the A13 autoroute.

See also
 Désert de Retz
 National Forest (France)

Travaux 

Geography of Yvelines
Forests of France
Tourist attractions in Île-de-France
Tourist attractions in Yvelines